Max Herrmann may refer to:

 Max Herrmann (theatrologist) (1865–1942), German literary historian and theorist of theatre studies
 Max Herrmann (athlete) (1885–1915), German sprinter